Mallory Burdette (born January 28, 1991 in Macon, Georgia) is the retired American collegiate and professional tennis player.

Personal life
Burdette was born to Alan and Judy Burdette in Macon, Georgia. She has two sisters, Erin and Lindsay, and a brother Andy, who all played tennis at the college-level.

She would have been a senior at Stanford University in the fall of 2012, but she gave up her final year of college eligibility to turn pro after her strong run at the 2012 US Open, where she reached the 3rd round, falling to then World No. 3 Maria Sharapova.

She announced her retirement from professional tennis in October 2014, after being inactive for over a year due to a shoulder injury.

Career

2006–2007
Burdette made her debut at the 2006 US Open, as a wild card in the women's doubles event. She partnered her sister Lindsay, and was beaten by Michaëlla Krajicek and Corina Morariu in two sets.

In October, she received a wildcard to play in the qualifying draw of an ITF $25,000 tournament in Augusta, Georgia, however she lost the match to Bulgarian Svetlana Krivencheva in three tight sets. In November, she played in the qualifying of an ITF $50,000 tournament in Lawrenceville, Georgia, again as a wildcard, where she was beaten by Tetiana Luzhanska. Burdette ended the year after having competed in three events.

She was absent from the tour in 2007.

2008
In July 2008, Mallory entered her first tournament since 2006, an ITF $10,000 event in Atlanta. For the first time, she not only qualified, but reached round two with a straight set win over Anastasia Kharchenko. She also made the quarterfinals in doubles (with sister Lindsay), losing to Mallory Cecil and Melanie Oudin.

This was the only tournament on the professional tour Burdette played in 2008.

2009–2010
In her only event of 2009, Burdette got a main draw wildcard at an ITF $25,000 tournament in Lutz, Florida. She was beaten in the first round by Soledad Esperón. She made the quarterfinals in doubles (partnering Grace Min) though, falling in a tight match to Kimberly Couts and Sharon Fichman.

She did not play in 2010.

2011–2012
Burdette's only tournament of 2011 was the 2011 US Open double tournament, where she received together with her partner Hilary Barte a wildcard. In the first round, they beat compatriots Alexa Glatch and Jamie Hampton in straight sets. – before advancing to the second round, where they lost against Andreja Klepač from Slovenia and Anna Tatishvili from Georgia.

Burdette received a wildcard into the main draw of the 2012 Bank of The West Classic in Stanford. In the first round, she defeated Anne Keothavong in three sets. She lost to Marion Bartoli in round two after leading in the first set.

A week after her second round defeat in Stanford, on July 16, Burdette headed to compete in her first ITF event, a $10,000 hard court tournament held in Evansville. She qualified for the main draw following three straight-set victories. Burdette defeated Sally Peers, Naomi Osaka, Bojana Bobusic, and Julia Elbaba, and reached her first final on the ITF circuit. She faced no. 1 seed, Ying-Ying Duan, and won in two sets. Burdette didn't drop a single set throughout the tournament. On top of that, she also managed a runner-up showing of doubles at the same event, partnering compatriot Natalie Pluskota.

The following week, Burdette headed to Lexington to compete in a $50,000 hard court tournament, on a wildcard. She defeated no. 1 seed Olivia Rogowska and took her winning streak to ten when she defeated Jessica Pegula in straight sets. However, her unbeaten run was ended in the third round when she was defeated by Madison Keys.

In the first week of August 2012, Burdette was a wildcard entry in the $100,000 Odlum Brown Vancouver Open. She defeated lucky loser Sherazad Benamar, Olga Savchuk, Olivia Rogowska, and Chichi Scholl to secure Burdette's place in the final. Another straight sets victory in the final over Jessica Pegula, gave Burdette her second ITF title within the space of a month. Similar to her first tournament win in Evansville, she won the title without dropping a set. As a result of the win in Vancouver, Burdette earned a main draw wildcard for the 2012 US Open. In the first round, Burdette defeated Swiss Timea Bacsinszky, backing it up with another straight sets win over Lucie Hradecká. Burdette's run came to an end in the third round, with a defeat to third seed Maria Sharapova.

2013–2014
While she did not play at the 2013 Australian Open, she entered the 2013 French Open for the first time and beat Donna Vekić in the first round but was eliminated in the second round by top-ten player Agnieszka Radwańska. She also entered in doubles with Sloane Stephens. The pair lost in the opening round to eventual champions Ekaterina Makarova and Elena Vesnina.

Burdette had a nagging shoulder injury which kept her out of play during the 2014 season. She announced an official retirement from the sport in October 2014, citing the aforementioned injury the reason.

Her last match on the professional tour was a tight first-round loss to Marina Erakovic in Quebec City at the 2013 Challenge Bell, on September 9, 2013.

ITF career finals

Singles: 2 (2–0)

Doubles 1 (0–1)

Singles performance timeline

References

External links
 
 

1991 births
Living people
American expatriates in the Netherlands
American female tennis players
Stanford Cardinal women's tennis players
Stanford University alumni
Tennis people from Georgia (U.S. state)
Sportspeople from Fort Lauderdale, Florida
People from Jackson, Georgia
Sportspeople from the Atlanta metropolitan area